David Prinosil was the defending champion but lost in the second round to Roger Federer.

Thomas Johansson won in the final 6–3, 6–7(5–7), 6–2 against Fabrice Santoro.

Seeds
A champion seed is indicated in bold text while text in italics indicates the round in which that seed was eliminated.

Draw

Finals

Top half

Bottom half

External links
 2001 Gerry Weber Open draw

 

2001 Gerry Weber Open